Jim Fitzpatrick (born August 28, 1959) is an American actor, producer, screenwriter, and director. He has appeared in over 65 feature films and television series. He also is the founder and president of Five Star Studios (established in 1992) and PacAtlantic Pictures, LLC (established in 2005).

Early life
Fitzpatrick is from Seminole, Florida. He began acting at age 13 when he appeared in his first school play, A Thousand Clowns, at Seminole High School in Florida. He accepted a football scholarship to Illinois State University, where he was a theater major. While living in Illinois, he became involved with the Steppenwolf Theatre Company, founded by Gary Sinise and John Malkovich.

Athletic career
Fitzpatrick pursued a career in professional football. He was a member of the Hamilton Tiger-Cats in the Canadian Football League (CFL) in 1981. Thereafter he played for short stints with the National Football League (NFL) Chicago Bears (1982) and the Baltimore Colts (1982). He retired from pro football in 1985, after spending three seasons with the Tampa Bay Bandits in the USFL (1983–85).

Acting career
Before moving to Los Angeles, he landed supporting roles in the feature films Cocoon, D.A.R.Y.L., and Phantom of the Ritz. His first television acting credit was on Miami Vice.

Filmography
 2023 Soulmates as Rudy Galiano
 2022 Shark Waters as Poppy
 2021 Last of the Grads as Mr Bradley
 2021 Bloodsport Generations as Uncle Duck
 2020 Mind Games as Roger
 2019 Time Off as Bernie
 2017 Do You See Me as Detective Jimmy Nichols 
 2016 Divorce Texas Style as Ozzie Partington
 2013 Gangster Squad as Terry McMurray
 2013 Eden 2 as Captain Stevens
 2013 A Fonder Heart as Dr. Evans
 2011 Dolphin Tale as Max
 2010 The Adventure Scouts as Allen Daniels 
 2008 The Belly of the Beast as Adam Simeon
 2007 Hallow's Point as Detective Frank Cates
 2006 The Indian as Dr. Vince
 2006 Blood Ranch as "Spider"
 2005 Distortion as Frank
 2005 Elizabethtown as Rusty
 2004 Supernatural (TV) (Pilot) as Calvin Gordon
 2004 The Code Conspiracy as John Davis
 2001-2005 Star Trek: Enterprise (7 episodes) as Commander Williams
 2003 The District (2 episodes) as Weston Buell
 2003 Threat Matrix as Robert Burkehart
 2002 An American Reunion as Jamie
 2002 ER as Lieutenant Colonel McGruen
 2002 The Agency as CIA Agent Gus Allman
 2002 100 Deeds for Eddie McDowd as Coach Hardgrave
 2002 Unreel: A Hollywood Story as Tommy
 2001 U.S. Seals as Mike Bradley
 1997-2001 JAG as Major Warren / Commander Douglas
 1999 Delta Force Clear Target as Skip Lang
 1998 Armageddon as Lieutenant Trev Tavis, NORAD Tech.
 1997 The Little Ghost as Tony
 1997 Pacific Blue as Captain Frank Hawkins
 1995-1996 All My Children (168 episodes) as Pierce Riley
 1994 Curse of the Starving Class as Emerson
 1994 The Glass Shield as Officer Jim Ryan
 1993 Renegade as Brett Quinn
 1993 Sweating Bullets (7 episodes) as "Rip" Chase
 1993 South of Sunset as Tony DiNato
 1992 Stand by Your Man as Kyle
 1991 Anything but Love as Detective
 1990 Sporting Chance as Davis
 1990 Ski Patrol as Young Father
 1989 Guts and Glory: The Rise and Fall of Oliver North as Sergeant Major Collins
 1989 Tour of Duty as Captain Pescow
 1986-1988 The New Gidget (5 episodes) as Tom Wilson
 1985-1987 Days of Our Lives (4 episodes) Dr. Robinson
 1987 Designing Women as Garret Jackson
 1987 The Last Fling as Bud
 1987 Shelter in the Storm as River
 1986 When the Bough Breaks as Reporter #3
 1986 Band of the Hand as Young Street Thug
 1986 Santa Barbara as Raz
 1986 Miami Vice as Teddy Lake
 1985 Cocoon as Dock Worker
 1985 D.A.R.Y.L. as T.A.S.C.O.M. Security Guard
 1985 Walking the Edge as Fat Man's Bodyguard 
 1979 Glory Days as Steve Street

References

External links

PacAtlantic Pictures

1959 births
Living people
American male television actors
American male film actors
Film directors from Nebraska
American film producers
Male actors from Omaha, Nebraska
Seminole High School (Pinellas County, Florida) alumni
Tampa Bay Bandits players
Steppenwolf Theatre Company players
Screenwriters from Nebraska